Crow Reservation may refer to:

 Crow Indian Reservation in Montana, associated with the Crow Nation
 Crow Creek Reservation in South Dakota, associated with the Crow Creek Sioux Tribe